The Littleton Elementary School District is an elementary school district in Avondale and Tolleson, Arizona. It operates seven elementary schools.

Schools
Collier Elementary
Country Place Leadership Academy
Estrella Vista STEM Academy
Fine Arts Academy
Littleton Elementary
Tres Rios Service Academy
Quentin Elementary

External links
 Official website

School districts in Arizona
School districts in Maricopa County, Arizona